Aarya Babbar is an Indian actor who appears in Bollywood and Punjabi films. In 2014, Aarya participated in the eighth season of Bigg Boss.

Career 
Aarya Babbar started his film career with Raj Kanwar's Ab Ke Baras alongside Amrita Rao. He has worked with stalwarts like Mani Ratnam, Madhur Bhandarkar and Vikram Bhatt. Also, he appeared in films such as Yaar Annmulle, Matru Ki Bijlee Ka Mandola and Ready. Aarya Babbar acted in the Bengali film Paapi in 2012, opposite Prosanjit, Pooja Bharti and Sayantika. The Hindi version Paapi released on 11 October 2013. In 2013, he also appeared in the Punjabi movie Heer and Hero, opposite Minissha Lamba.

He was a contestant on Bigg Boss 8, where he managed to survive for 8 weeks and 56 days. Aarya Babbar released his first novel My fiancée, me & #IFu**ed Up on 2 February 2015. He has also written a comic book named Pushpak Viman.

Awards and nominations
He was nominated at the Star Screen Awards in the Most Promising Newcomer - Male category for his film Ab Ke Baras.

Filmography

TV shows

Personal life 
Aarya Babbar is the son of actor turned politician Raj Babbar and theatre personality Nadira Babbar. He has one elder sister, the actress Juhi Babbar, whose husband is the famous actor Anup Soni. Aarya also has a half-brother, the actor Prateik Babbar, who is the son of Raj Babbar by his second wife Smita Patil. Through his mother Nadira Babbar (born Nadira Zaheer), Aarya is the grandson of the communist activist Sajjad Zaheer and the first cousin of Pankhuri Zaheer. On 22 Feb 2016, Aarya married his girlfriend Jasmine Puri in a traditional Sikh wedding ceremony. Jasmine is reported to be employed at a major film/TV production house.

References

External links
 
 

21st-century Indian male actors
Bigg Boss (Hindi TV series) contestants
Indian male film actors
Living people
Male actors from Mumbai
Male actors in Hindi cinema
Male actors in Punjabi cinema
Punjabi people
1981 births